The Last Tour on Earth is a live album comprising recordings from Marilyn Manson's Mechanical Animals Tour, Beautiful Monsters Tour and Rock is Dead Tour, released on November 12, 1999. On the studio version of "The Dope Show", Manson says that drugs "are made in California", but in the live version, he says that "drugs, they say, are made right here in Cleveland", to a roar of crowd approval, suggesting that the song was recorded in Cleveland, Ohio. "Lunchbox" was recorded in Grand Rapids, Michigan, and "I Don't Like the Drugs (But the Drugs Like Me)" was recorded in Cedar Rapids, Iowa. "The Last Day on Earth" was recorded in Las Vegas on the Mechanical Animals Tour, and "Get Your Gunn" was recorded some time during the Rock is Dead Tour.

Rock is Dead is introduced as if Omega and the Mechanical Animals, the alter-egos Manson and his band devised for the Mechanical Animals album and tour, were playing. Some of the tracks, most notably "I Don't Like the Drugs (But the Drugs Like Me)", are prefaced with spoken diatribes.

The album includes one new studio track, "Astonishing Panorama of the Endtimes", which also appears on the Celebrity Deathmatch soundtrack.

Although extensive amounts of performance footage was captured (partially shown In The 40 minute documentary God Is in the T.V.) a live DVD of this tour did not materialize.

Accolades
In 2006, sister British magazines Classic Rock & Metal Hammer included The Last Tour on Earth (mislabeled The Last Show on Earth) in The 200 Greatest Albums of the 90s.

Track listing

Bonus Disc 

A 2CD limited edition was released with a bonus disc, containing 3 tracks exclusive to this release.

Personnel
Marilyn Manson – vocals
John 5 – guitars
Twiggy Ramirez – bass
Ginger Fish – drums
Madonna Wayne Gacy – keyboards

Charts and certifications

Weekly charts

Certifications

References

Marilyn Manson (band) albums
1999 live albums
Interscope Records live albums
Nothing Records live albums
Albums produced by Marilyn Manson